The Roaring Camp & Big Trees Narrow Gauge Railroad is a  narrow-gauge tourist railroad in California that starts from the Roaring Camp depot in Felton, California and runs up steep grades through redwood forests to the top of nearby Bear Mountain, a distance of .

The railroad runs most trains using steam locomotives, several dating from the 1890s. They are some of the oldest narrow-gauge steam locomotives still providing regular passenger service in the United States. (The Cumbres & Toltec Scenic Railroad has the oldest steam locomotive from 1883.)

The American Society of Mechanical Engineers designated three of the railroad's locomotives as Historic Mechanical Engineering Landmark #134 in 1988.

History 
Roaring Camp Railroads operations began in 1963 under the guidance of  F. Norman Clark (1935–1985), who was the founder and owner. His purpose was to keep a family tradition of constructing railroads and to "bring the romance and color of steam railroading back to America".  In 1958, Clark found the engine Dixiana abandoned near a coal mine in the Appalachian Mountains; he described it as looking like a " rusty pile of junk". Dixiana was reconditioned and began service in 1963 on rails that had been shipped around Cape Horn in 1881. The railway route was laid out so that as few trees as possible would have to be cut on the  Clark acquired with a 99-year lease of the larger Big Trees Ranch.

The Big Trees Ranch was bought in 1867 by San Francisco businessman Joseph Warren Welch to preserve the giant redwood trees from logging. It was the first property in the state acquired specifically for that purpose. In 1930, the Welch family sold part of the property to Santa Cruz County, which eventually became part of Henry Cowell Redwoods State Park.

The first scheduled train trip was on April 6, 1963 with 44 ticketed passengers.

Clark's wife, Georgiana, Vice President of Operations  assumed the ownership and management responsibilities following his death on December 2, 1985.

Originally, two large trestles formed a "corkscrew" loop at Spring Canyon, but these were destroyed by a 1976 fire (alleged to have been arson), the smoke from which could be seen from San Francisco.  Within six months, a switchback was constructed to bypass the severed loop and the line was returned to service. The switchback has an estimated 9.5% grade. The length of the tail tracks in the switchback restricts the trains that may be operated to six cars or fewer; longer trains require a diesel switcher to run at the rear and bring the excess cars up and down the switchback separately. Special events are held to raise funds for repair and reconstruction of the trestles and steam locomotives at Roaring Camp. In 2003, the first "Day Out with Thomas" special event was held. The event was the single largest in the 40-year history of Roaring Camp, with an estimated 25,000 participants over a three-day period.

Accidents and incidents
On December 28, 2015, a train collided with a stop block on part of the switchback. Six people were injured. The cause was driver error.

Locomotives 

The railroad owns several locomotives in various states of repair.  Regular service is typically handled by the railroad's two Shay locomotives, with occasional appearances by the Heisler.   "Kahuku," the oldest locomotive on the roster, is used in shuttle service on special occasions.  Due to its small size, it is not capable of hauling trains up the mountain.

Historic mechanical engineering landmark

The American Society of Mechanical Engineers collectively designated Roaring Camp's Shay, Climax and Heisler engines National Mechanical Engineering Historical Landmark (#134) on August 1988, as examples of small, slow-speed 19th century geared locomotives.

Dixiana Shay #1

Built in 1912, this engine was originally owned by the Alaculsy Lumber Company, and was used on the Smokey Mountain Railroad in Tennessee. The Dixiana is named for a small narrow-gauge mining railroad, now abandoned, out of Dixiana, Virginia.  Notable characteristics include the boiler, which was set left of centerline to compensate for the weight and position of the engine – giving it a lopsided appearance – and the engine design of a three-cylinder exhaust system.

Bloomsburg Climax #5 
The Bloomsburg was built in 1928 for the Elk River Coal and Lumber Company in Swandale, West Virginia.
Previous owners include W.M. Ritter Lumber Company, Georgia Pacific Railroad, and the Carroll Park and Western Railroad in Bloomsburg, Pennsylvania  until bought for Roaring Camp in 1975.
It is the last locomotive of its type manufactured by Climax that operated for logging in the west.

Tuolumne Heisler #2

Built in 1899 for the Hetch Hetchy Valley and Yosemite Railroad for use at the sawmill of West Side Flume and Lumber Company near Tuolumne City. First named Thomas S. Bullock after the first general manager of the West Side Flume and Lumber Company,  the locomotive was purchased for Roaring Camp in 1962 for $7,000. It is the last steam engine used in the commercial lumber business in Tuolumne, California, and the oldest Heisler still in operation.

See also 

 Geared steam locomotive
 List of heritage railroads in the United States
 Logging railroad
 Ocean Shore Railroad
 Santa Cruz, Big Trees and Pacific Railway
 Santa Cruz Railroad
 U.S. common-carrier narrow gauges in the twentieth century

References

External links 

 
 
 
Roaring Camp Railroads A personal visit in 2006 with photographs

Heritage railroads in California
Transportation in Santa Cruz County, California
3 ft gauge railways in the United States
Narrow gauge railroads in California
Tourist attractions in Santa Cruz County, California
1963 establishments in California
Railway companies established in 1963
Railways with Zig Zags